Tulsipur is a constituency of the Uttar Pradesh Legislative Assembly covering the city of Tulsipur in the Balrampur district of Uttar Pradesh, India.

Tulsipur is one of five assembly constituencies in the Shravasti Lok Sabha constituency. Since 2008, this assembly constituency is numbered 291 amongst 403 constituencies.

Election results

2022

17th Vidhan Sabha: 2017 General Elections

References

External links
 

Assembly constituencies of Uttar Pradesh
Balrampur district, Uttar Pradesh